The first matches of the season were played on 28 March 2009 with the season ending in the Grand Final on 26 September 2009.

Teams 
Twelve teams competed in the 2009 Shute Shield season from Sydney.

z Does not field a team in the 1st Grade Colts competition

Ladders

Seniors

First Grade (Shute Shield)

Finals

Finals Rd1 
 Finals Rd1 match 1 

Finals Rd1 match 2

Semi-finals 
Semi-final 1

Semi-final 2

Final

Second Grade (Colin Caird Shield) 

 RD12 Sydney University V Penrith postponedRd 12 Northern Suburbs V Warringah postponed

Finals

Finals Rd1 
 Finals Rd1 match 1 

Finals Rd1 match 2

Semi-finals 
Semi-final 1

Semi-final 2

Final

Third Grade (JR Henderson Shield) 

RD9 Manly v Gordon postponed till June 30** RD12 Sydney University V Penrith postponedRd 12 Northern Suburbs V Warringah postponed

Finals

Finals Rd1 
 Finals Rd1 match 1 

Finals Rd1 match 2

Semi-finals 
Semi-final 1

Semi-final 2

Final

Fourth Grade (Henderson Cup) 

Parramatta Withdrew from the Henderson Cup in Rd7
RD9 Manly V Gordon postponed till August 22 JuneRD9 West Harbour V Warringah postponed till August 22RD12 Sydney University V Penrith postponedRd 12 Northern Suburbs V Warringah postponed

Finals

Finals Rd1 
 Finals Rd1 match 1 

Finals Rd1 match 2

Semi-finals 
Semi-final 1

Semi-final 2

Final

Colts (Under 20s)

First Colts (W. McMahon Memorial Shield) 

Warringah lost 4 competition points for breaching of rulesSydney University lost 4 points for breaching the player points cap in round 3.
RD12 Northern Suburbs V Warringah postponed

Finals

Finals Rd1 
 Finals Rd1 match 1 

Finals Rd1 match 2

Semi-finals 
Semi-final 1

Semi-final 2

Final

Second Colts (Shell Trophy) 

RD12 Northern Suburbs V Warringah postponed

Finals

Finals Rd1 
 Finals Rd1 match 1 

Finals Rd1 match 2

Semi-finals 
Semi-final 1

Semi-final 2

Final

Third Colts

Finals

Finals Rd1 
 Finals Rd1 match 1 

Finals Rd1 match 2

Semi-finals 
Semi-final 1

Semi-final 2

Final

Club Championship 
Club competition points are calculated thus: 1st grade x 15, 2nd grade x 8, 3rd grade x 5, 4th grade x 4, 1st colts x 6, 2nd colts x 3, 3rd colts x 2

Grade (Gregor George Cup) 

Parramatta lost 4 competition points in 4th grade and 16 club championship points following its late forfeit in RD5

Colts (Eric Spilstead Shield) 

Shute Shield season
Shute Shield